The following is a list of notable rhythm guitarists, arranged in ascending alphabetical order of last name. 
Rhythm guitarists perform a combination of two functions: they provide all or part of the rhythmic pulse in conjunction with other rhythm section instruments (bass and drums) and they provide all or part of the harmony, i.e. the chords.

For a list of lead guitarists see List of lead guitarists. Only add names here if the person has their own article on Wikipedia, please. Anything else will be removed.

A

Bryan Adams
Doug Aldrich (Whitesnake)
Christopher Amott (Arch Enemy)
Michael Amott (Arch Enemy)
Gem Archer (Oasis)
Mark Arm (Mudhoney)
Joan Armatrading
Billie Joe Armstrong (Green Day, Pinhead Gunpowder)
Tim Armstrong (Rancid)
Paul "Bonehead" Arthurs (Oasis)

B

Matt Bachand (Shadows Fall)
Brian Baker (Minor Threat, Dag Nasty, Bad Religion)
Terry Balsamo (Cold, Evanescence)
Carl Barat (The Libertines)
George Barnes (Swing era)
Bobby Bandiera (Bon Jovi)
Syd Barrett (Pink Floyd)
Zoltan Bathory (Five Finger Death Punch)
Brian Bell (Weezer, Space Twins, The Relationship)
Chuck Berry
Brian Benoit (Dillinger Escape Plan)
Frank Black (The Pixies)
Jack Black (Tenacious D)
Norman Blake Bluegrass
Norman Blake (BMX Bandits, Teenage Fanclub)
Rico Blanco (Rivermaya)
Bono (U2)
Avi Bortnick (John Scofield)
James Bourne (Son of Dork, Busted)
David Bowie
Niall Breslin (The Blizzards)
Chris Broderick (Megadeth, Jag Panzer)
Michael Bruce (Alice Cooper)
Peter Buck (R.E.M.)
Ely Buendia (The Eraserheads, Pupil)
Beau Burchell (Saosin)
Benjamin Burnley (Breaking Benjamin)
David Byrne (Talking Heads)

C

Carlos Cadona (Dead Kennedys)
Joey Cape (Me First and the Gimme Gimmes)
Eric Carmen (The Raspberries)
Bob Casale (Devo)
Johnny Cash
Nick Catanese (Black Label Society)
Max Cavalera (Sepultura, Soulfly, Cavalera Conspiracy)
Vincent Cavanagh (Anathema)
Dino Cazares (Fear Factory, Brujeria, Divine Heresy)
Doug Cerrito (Suffocation)
Nic Cester (Jet)
Gab Chee Kee (Parokya ni Edgar)
Don Clark (Demon Hunter)
Steve Clark (Def Leppard)
Gilby Clarke (Guns N' Roses, Rock Star Supernova)
Allen Collins (Lynyrd Skynyrd)
Catfish Collins (Parliament, Funkadelic, James Brown)
Eddie Condon
Dennis Coffey Temptations, Rare Earth
John Connolly (Sevendust)
Jamie Cook (Arctic Monkeys)
John Corabi (Mötley Crüe)
Billy Corgan (The Smashing Pumpkins)
Chris Cornell (Audioslave, Soundgarden, Temple of the Dog)
Gene Cornish (The Rascals, The Young Rascals)
Mick Cripps (L.A. Guns)
Jason Cropper (Weezer)
Steve Cropper (Booker T. & the M.G.'s)
David Crosby (The Byrds)
Robbin Crosby (Ratt)
Phil Cunningham (New Order, Marion, Bad Lieutenant)

D

Roger Daltrey (The Who)
Ray Davies (The Kinks)
Tom DeLonge (Blink-182, Box Car Racer, Angels & Airwaves)
Brad Delp (Boston)
Rick Derringer (The McCoys, Edgar Winter)
Matt DeVries (Chimaira)
Neil Diamond
Dez Dickerson (Prince)
Mamadou Diop (MAMADOU)
Pete Doherty (The Libertines)
Edsel Dope (Dope)
K. K. Downing (Judas Priest)
Chris Dreja (The Yardbirds)
Oscar Dronjak (HammerFall)
Gary Duncan (Quicksilver Messenger Service)
Jeff Duncan (Armored Saint)
William DuVall (Alice in Chains)
Bob Dylan

E

Richey Edwards (Manic Street Preachers)
Richie Edwards (Stone Gods)
Danny Elfman (Oingo Boingo)
Sam Endicott (The Bravery)
Everlast
Roky Erickson (The 13th Floor Elevators)
Sully Erna (Godsmack)
Omar Espinosa (Escape the Fate)
Don Everly
Jason Everman (Nirvana)

F

Andy Fairweather Low (Amen Corner, Eric Clapton, Roger Waters, The Who, Joe Satriani)
Andrew Farriss (INXS)
John Feldmann (Goldfinger)
Warren Fitzgerald (Oingo Boingo)
Tom Fletcher (McFly)
Robb Flynn (Machine Head)
Tom Fogerty (Creedence Clearwater Revival)
Jerome Fontamillas (Switchfoot)
Dave Fortman (Ugly Kid Joe)
Richard Fortus (Guns N' Roses)
Lars Frederiksen (Rancid)
Jay Jay French (Twisted Sister)
Eric Friedman (Creed)
Marcelo Fromer (Titãs)
Glenn Frey (The Eagles)
Daniel Freyberg (Children of Bodom, Bodom After Midnight)
Richie Furay (Buffalo Springfield, Poco)

G

Eric Gale (Stuff)
Anthony Gallo (Suicidal Tendencies)
Craig Gannon (Aztec Camera, The Bluebells, The Smiths)
Janet Gardner (Vixen)
Danny Gatton
Per Gessle (Roxette)
Barry Gibb (The Bee Gees)
Maurice Gibb (The Bee Gees)
Ben Gibbard (Death Cab for Cutie)
Lynval Golding (The Specials, Fun Boy Three)
Adam Gontier (Three Days Grace)
Matthew Good (Matthew Good Band)
Stone Gossard (Pearl Jam)
Roland Grapow (Helloween)
Dallas Green (Alexisonfire)
Freddie Green (Count Basie Orchestra)
Brian Greenway (April Wine, Mashmakhan)
Dave Grohl (Foo Fighters)
Fred Guy
Janick Gers (Iron Maiden)

H

Mårten Hagström (Meshuggah)
Lzzy Hale (Halestorm)
Bill Haley (Bill Haley & His Comets)
Jim Hall
John Hall (Orleans, Bonnie Raitt)
Albert Hammond Jr. (The Strokes)
Jeff Hanneman (Slayer)
Glen Hansard (The Frames)
Kai Hansen (Gamma Ray, Helloween)
Richie Havens
Dan Hawkins (The Darkness)
Matt Heafy (Trivium)
Charles Hedger (Cradle of Filth)
Martin Henriksson (Dark Tranquillity)
James Hetfield (Metallica)
Nick Hexum (311)
Susanna Hoffs (The Bangles)
Noddy Holder (Slade)
Dexter Holland (The Offspring)
Buddy Holly (The Crickets)
John Lee Hooker
Hyde (L'Arc-en-Ciel)
Chrissie Hynde (The Pretenders)

I

Scott Ian (Anthrax)
John Idan (The Yardbirds)
James Iha (The Smashing Pumpkins)
Frank Iero (My Chemical Romance)
Inoran (Luna Sea)
Izzy Stradlin (Guns N' Roses)

J

Jaret Reddick (Bowling For Soup)
Jim James (My Morning Jacket)
Mark Jansen (Epica)
Russell Javors (Billy Joel Band)
Al Jardine (The Beach Boys)
Patrik Jensen (The Haunted)
Joan Jett (Joan Jett and The Blackhearts, The Runaways)
Lars-Olof Johansson (The Cardigans)
Wilko Johnson (Dr. Feelgood, The Blockheads)
Christofer Johnsson (Therion)
Tom Johnston (Doobie Brothers)
Nick Jonas (Jonas Brothers)
Brian Jones (Rolling Stones)
Jung Yong-hwa (CN Blue)
Jinxx (Black Veil Brides)
Juanes

K

Paul Kantner (Jefferson Airplane, Hot Tuna)
Steve Katz (Blood, Sweat, and Tears)
Alex Kapranos (Franz Ferdinand)
Bob Katsionis (Firewind)
John Kay (Steppenwolf)
Gab Chee-Kee (Parokya ni Edgar)
Pepper Keenan (Corrosion of Conformity)
Bill Kelliher (Mastodon)
Mike Keneally (Dethklok)
Myles Kennedy (Alter Bridge)
Ryan Key (Yellowcard)
Joe King (The Fray)
Kerry King (Slayer)
Jonas Kjellgren (Scar Symmetry)
Scott Klopfenstein (Reel Big Fish)
David Knopfler (Dire Straits)
Tomi Koivusaari (Amorphis)
Carl Kress
Robbie Krieger (The Doors)
Chad Kroeger (Nickelback)
Steffen Kummerer (Obscura)
Alexander Kuoppala (Children of Bodom)
Dave Kushner (Velvet Revolver)

L

Michael Landau (Boz Scaggs, Joni Mitchell, James Taylor, Miles Davis
Paul Landers (Rammstein)
Andy LaRocque (King Diamond)
Tito Larriva (Cruzados, Tito & Tarantula)
Martin Larsson (At the Gates)
Roope Latvala (Children of Bodom)
Avril Lavigne
Blackie Lawless (W.A.S.P.)
John LeCompt (Evanescence)
Larry Lee (Gypsy Sun and Rainbows, Al Green)
Sébastien Lefebvre (Simple Plan)
John Lennon (The Beatles)
Jared Leto (Thirty Seconds to Mars)
Adam Levine (Maroon 5)
Aaron Lewis (Staind)
Matty Lewis (Zebrahead)
Mike Lewis (Lostprophets)
Herman Li (DragonForce)
Hal Lindes (Dire Straits)
Glenn Ljungström (Dimension Zero)
Kenny Loggins (Loggins and Messina, solo artist)
John Lombardo (10,000 Maniacs)
Courtney Love (Hole)
Parker Lundgren (Queensrÿche)
Simaro Lutumba (Tout Puissant Orchestre Kinshasa Jazz)

M

Bryan MacLean (Love)
Ian Mackaye (Fugazi)
Benji Madden (Good Charlotte)
Joel Madden (Good Charlotte)
Jen Majura (Evanescence)
Bob Marley
Steve Marriott (Humble Pie)
Chris Martin (Coldplay)
Dave Mason (Traffic)
Dave Matthews (Dave Matthews Band)
Justin Mauriello (I Hate Kate, Zebrahead)
Lee Mavers (The La's)
Brian May (Queen)
Curtis Mayfield (The Impressions)
Paul McCartney (The Beatles)
Kim McAuliffe (Girlschool)
George McCorkle (The Marshall Tucker Band)
Hugh McCracken
Country Joe McDonald (Country Joe & The Fish)
Brownie McGhee
Tim McIlrath (Rise Against)
Duff McKagan (Loaded)
Al McKay (Earth, Wind & Fire)
Sarah McLachlan
Eric Melvin (NOFX)
Wendy Melvoin (Wendy & Lisa, Prince and The Revolution)
Joe Messina (The Funk Brothers)
Bret Michaels (Poison)
Paulo Miklos (Titãs)
Shaun Morgan (Seether)
Sterling Morrison (Velvet Underground)
Cameron Muncey (Jet)
Dave Mustaine (Megadeth)
Taylor Momsen (The Pretty Reckless)

N

Graham Nash (The Hollies, Crosby, Stills, Nash & Young) 
A.C. Newman (The New Pornographers)
Simon Nicol (Fairport Convention)
Leo Nocentelli (The Meters)
Jimmy Nolen (The J.B.'s)
Fredrik Nordström (Dream Evil)

O

Ed O'Brien (Radiohead)
John Oates (Hall & Oates)
Ric Ocasek (The Cars)
Kele Okereke (Bloc Party)
Roy Orbison

P

Dave Padden (Annihilator)
Jimmy Page (The Yardbirds)
Marek "Spider" Pająk (Vader)
Rick Parfitt (Status Quo)
Ralph Patt
Pata (X Japan)
Kirk Pengilly (INXS)
Trevor Peres (Obituary)
Carl Perkins
Peter Perrett (The Only Ones)
Steve Perry (Cherry Poppin' Daddies)
Eric Peterson (Testament)
Mille Petrozza (Kreator)
Tom Petty (Tom Petty & The Heartbreakers)
Dave Peverett (Foghat)
John Pisano (Tijuana Brass, Sérgio Mendes)
Bucky Pizzarelli
Chris Poland (Megadeth)
Elvis Presley
Prince
Jett Pangan (The Dawn)

R

David Ragsdale (Kansas)
Johnny Ramone (The Ramones)
Josh Ramsay (Marianas Trench)
Jaret Reddick (Bowling for Soup)
Jimmy Reed
Lou Reed (The Velvet Underground)
Kurt Reifler
Tim Reynolds
John Rich (Big & Rich)
Keith Richards (The Rolling Stones)
Brian Robertson (Thin Lizzy)
Ed Robertson (Barenaked Ladies)
Johnny Rod (W.A.S.P.)
Nile Rodgers (Chic)
Dean Roland (Collective Soul)
Jim Root (Slipknot, Stone Sour)
Gavin Rossdale (Bush, Institute)
Gary Rossington (Lynyrd Skynyrd)
Darius Rucker (Hootie & the Blowfish)
Mike Rutherford (Genesis)
Paul Ryan (Cradle of Filth)

S

Claudio Sanchez (Coheed and Cambria)
Jon Schaffer (Iced Earth)
Rudolf Schenker (Scorpions)
Patti Scialfa (Bruce Springsteen and the E Street Band)
John Sebastian (The Lovin' Spoonful)
Boz Scaggs
Mike Schleibaum (Darkest Hour)
James "Munky" Shaffer (Korn)
Shagrath (Chrome Division)
Garry Shider (Parliament-Funkadelic )
Mike Shinoda (Linkin Park)
Marcus Siepen (Blind Guardian)
Charlie Simpson (Fightstar)
Fred "Sonic" Smith (MC5)
Silenoz (Dimmu Borgir)
Acey Slade (Misfits, Dope, Trashlight Vision)
Mark Slaughter (Slaughter)
Brendon Small (Dethklok)
Pat Smear (Germs, Nirvana, Foo Fighters)
Adrian Smith (Iron Maiden)
Robert Smith (The Cure)
Tom Smith (Editors)
Skip Spence (Moby Grape)
Tony Spinner (Toto)
David Spinozza
Layne Staley (Alice in Chains, Mad Season)
Paul Stanley (Kiss)
Mikael Stanne (Dark Tranquillity)
Wayne Static (Static-X)
Cat Stevens (Yusuf Islam)
Mike Stone (Queensrÿche)
Izzy Stradlin (Guns N' Roses)
Jesper Strömblad (In Flames, Dimension Zero, Cyhra)
Joe Strummer (The Clash)
Patrick Stump (Fall Out Boy)
Nasty Suicide (Hanoi Rocks)
Andy Summers (The Police)
Dan Swanö (Bloodbath)
Matthew Sweet
Michael Sweet (Stryper)
Sylvain Sylvain (New York Dolls)
Dennis Stratton (Iron Maiden)
Patryk Dominik Sztyber (Behemoth)

T

Ray Tabano (Aerosmith)
Takuro (Glay)
Serj Tankian (System of a Down)
Evan Taubenfeld
Corey Taylor (Slipknot, Stone Sour)
Tommy Tedesco
Bobby Tench
Teru (guitarist) (Versailles (band), Jupiter (band))
Roger Taylor (The Cross, Queen)
Tom Thacker (Gob)
Mick Thomson (Slipknot)
Scott Thurston (Tom Petty and the Heartbreakers)
Paul Tobias (Guns N' Roses)
Simon Tong (The Verve, The Shining, The Good, the Bad & the Queen)
Sam Totman (DragonForce)
Pete Townshend (The Who)
Matthew Tuck (Bullet for My Valentine)
Corin Tucker (Sleater-Kinney)
Alex Turner (Arctic Monkeys)
Erik Turner (Warrant)
Jeff Tuttle (Dillinger Escape Plan)

V

Nick Valensi (The Strokes)
Kathy Valentine (The Go-Go's)
Kurdt Vanderhoof (Metal Church)
Anneke van Giersbergen (Anneke van Giersbergen)
Steve Van Zandt (E Street Band)
Jimmie Vaughan (The Fabulous Thunderbirds)
Eddie Vedder (Pearl Jam)

W

Joe Walsh (James Gang, Eagles)
Dustie Waring (Between the Buried and Me)
Roger Waters (Pink Floyd)
Bob Weir (Grateful Dead)
Brian Welch (Korn)
Bob Welch (Fleetwood Mac)
Bruce Welch (The Shadows)
Emil Werstler (Chimaira, Dååth)
Robert Westerholt (Within Temptation)
Deryck Whibley (Sum 41)
Robert White (The Funk Brothers)
Brad Whitford (Aerosmith)
Danny Whitten (Crazy Horse)
Jane Wiedlin (The Go-Go's)
Rich Williams (Kansas)
Eddie Willis (The Funk Brothers)
Nancy Wilson (Heart)
Ricky Wilson (The B-52's)
Kirk Windstein (Crowbar)
Christian Olde Wolbers (Fear Factory, Arkaea)
Ronnie Wood (Faces, The Rolling Stones)
Jack White (The White Stripes)

Y

Taylor York (Paramore)
Thom Yorke (Radiohead,  The Smile)
George Young (The Easybeats)
Malcolm Young (AC/DC)

Z

Robin Zander (Cheap Trick)
John Zwetsloot (Dissection)

See also 
 List of classical guitarists
 List of drummers
 List of jazz guitarists
 List of lead guitarists
 List of bass guitarists
 List of slide guitarists
 List of keyboardists

References

 
Rhythm guitarists